Actinotignum schaalii is a bacterium first isolated from human blood cultures. Its type strain is CCUG 27420. It is a Gram-positive, facultative anaerobic coccoid rod, considered a human pathogen.

References

Further reading
Bank, Steffen, et al. "Actinobaculum schaalii, a common uropathogen in elderly patients, Denmark." Emerging infectious diseases 16.1 (2010): 76.

External links
LPSN

Actinomycetales
Bacteria described in 1997